Marshall's Collection of Songs, Comic, Satirical is a chapbook style songbook, giving the lyrics of local, now historical songs, with a few bits of other information. It was published by John Marshall in 1827.

Details
 Marshall's Collection of Songs, Comic, Satirical 1827 (full title – "A Collection of Songs, Comic, Satirical, and Descriptive, chiefly in the Newcastle Dialect, and illustrative of the language and manners of the common people on the Banks of the Tyne and neighbourhood. By T. Thompson, J. Shields, W. Mitford, H Robson, and Others. Newcastle upon Tyne, Printed by John Marshal in the Old Flesh Market 1827) is a Chapbook style book of Geordie folk songs consisting of approx. 230 pages and over 130 song lyrics approximately 230 pages and over 130 song lyrics, published in 1827.

The publication 
It is, as the title suggests, a collection of songs which would have been popular, or topical, at the date of publication. There is very little in the way of biographies of any of the writers or histories of the events.

The front cover of the book was as thus :-<br/ ><br/ >

A<br/ >
COLLECTION<br/ >
OF<br/ >
SONGS<br/ >
Comic, Satirical, and Descriptive ,<br/ >
CHIEFLY IN THE,<br/ >
NEWCASTLE DIA;ECT<br/ >
And illustrative of the Language and Manners of the Common<br/ >
People on the Banks of the Tyne and Neighbourhood .<br/ >
BY T. THOMPSON, J. SHIELD, W. MIDFORD ,<br/ >
H ROBSON, AND OTHERS .<br/ >
<br/ >
NEWCASTLE UPON TYNE:<br/ >
PRINTED BY JOHN MARSHALL <br/ >
IN THE OLD FLESH MARKET <br/ >
1827<br/ >

Contents 
Are as below :<br/ >

<br/ >

Notes
A-4  –  according to George Allan's Tyneside Songs and Readings of 1891, the writer is anon – but Allan suggests that it could be John Shield <br/ >
A-C1  –  according to George Allan's Tyneside Songs and Readings of 1891, the writer is George Cameron <br/ >
A-R1  –  according to George Allan's Tyneside Songs and Readings of 1891, the writer is Henry Robson <br/ >
A-S1  –  according to George Allan's Tyneside Songs and Readings of 1891, the writer is John Selkirk <br/ >
A-S2  –  according to George Allan's Tyneside Songs and Readings of 1891, the writer is John Shield <br/ >
A-S3  –  according to George Allan's Tyneside Songs and Readings of 1891, the writer is James Stawpert <br/ >
A-S5  –  according to George Allan's Tyneside Songs and Readings of 1891, the writer is William Stephenson (senior) <br/ >
A-Tune03 – according to George Allan's Tyneside Songs and Readings of 1891, the tune is "Paddy's Wedding"<br/ >
A-Tune04 – according to George Allan's Tyneside Songs and Readings of 1891, the tune is "Jemmy Joneson's Whurry"<br/ >
A-Tune06 – according to George Allan's Tyneside Songs and Readings of 1891, the tune is "Scots Wha Hae"<br/ >
A-Tune07 – according to George Allan's Tyneside Songs and Readings of 1891, the tune is "The Keel Row"<br/ >
A-Tune08 – according to George Allan's Tyneside Songs and Readings of 1891, the tune is "Auld Lang Syne"<br/ >
A-Tune09 – according to George Allan's Tyneside Songs and Readings of 1891, the tune is "Barbara Bell"<br/ >
A-Tune10 – according to George Allan's Tyneside Songs and Readings of 1891, the tune is "Bonny Pit Laddie"<br/ >
F-A1  –  according to Fordyce's Tyne Songster of 1840, the writer is William Armstrong <br/ >
F-E1  –  according to Fordyce's Tyne Songster of 1840, the writer is Robert Emery <br/ >
F-G1  –  according to Fordyce's Tyne Songster of 1840, the writer is John Gibson <br/ >
F-G2  –  according to Fordyce's Tyne Songster of 1840, the writer is Robert Gilchrist <br/ >
F-M1  –  according to Fordyce's Tyne Songster of 1840, the writer is William Mitford <br/ >
F-O1  –  according to Fordyce's Tyne Songster of 1840, the writer is William Oliver <br/ >
F-R2  –  according to Fordyce's Tyne Songster of 1840, the writer is Joseph Philip Robson <br/ >
F-Tune03 – according to Fordyce's Tyne Songster of 1840, the tune is "The Young May Moon"<br/ >
F-Tune08 – according to Fordyce's Tyne Songster of 1840, the tune is "We've aye been provided for"<br/ >
F-Tune09 – according to Fordyce's Tyne Songster of 1840, the tune is "Barbara Bell"<br/ >
F-Tune12 – according to Fordyce's Tyne Songster of 1840, the tune is "Scots Wha Hae"<br/ >
Fr-G2 – according to France's Songs of the Bards of the Tyne – 1850, the writer is Robert Gilchrist <br/ >
Fr-Tune02 – according to France's Songs of the Bards of the Tyne – 1850, the tune is "Miss Bailey's Ghost"<br/ >
Fr-Tune03 – according to France's Songs of the Bards of the Tyne – 1850, the tune is "Canny Newcassel"<br/ >
Fr-Tune07 – according to France's Songs of the Bards of the Tyne – 1850, the tune is "Polly Parker, O"<br/ >
R-Tune01  –  according to Ross' Songs of the Tyne of 1846, the tune is "Derry Down"<br/ >
R-Tune02  –  according to Ross' Songs of the Tyne of 1846, the tune is "Duncan Davison"<br/ >

See also 
Geordie dialect words<br/ >
John Marshall

References

External links
 Marshall's Collection of Songs, Comic, Satirical 1827

Songs related to Newcastle upon Tyne
Northumbrian folklore
Chapbooks